Oliver Redgate (16 February 1863 – 11 February 1913) was an English first-class cricketer active – who played for Nottinghamshire. He was born in Lenton; died in Sherwood.

References

1863 births
1913 deaths
English cricketers
Nottinghamshire cricketers
Married v Single cricketers
People from Lenton, Nottingham
Cricketers from Nottinghamshire